Amy Carole Foster (née Turner) is an American engineer who is an associate professor in the Department of Electrical and Computer Engineering at Johns Hopkins University. Her work considers nonlinear optics and silicon-based photonic devices.

Early life and education 
Foster studied electrical engineering at the University at Buffalo. She moved to Cornell University for her graduate studies, where she worked with Michal Lipson. Her doctoral research looked at nonlinear optics in silicon waveguides. After earning her doctorate, Foster worked as a postdoctoral fellow at Johns Hopkins University.

Research and career 
In 2010, Foster joined the faculty at Johns Hopkins University. Her research considers the development of silicon-based photonic devices for new technologies. For the encryption of data, Foster developed a nonlinear photonic crystalline disk with input and output waveguides. This device configuration allows for the reproducible scrambling of signals, which creates specific keys for various information inputs. Such devices are almost impossible to clone, and reliably generate a large number of keys for the secure transmission of data.

Foster has served as an Associate Editor of Optics Express since 2016 and was appointed The Optical Society Siegman International Summer School lecturer in 2018.

Awards and honors 

 2012 DARPA Young Faculty Award
 2016 Johns Hopkins University Catalyst Award

Selected publications

References 

Cornell University College of Engineering alumni
University at Buffalo alumni
American women scientists
Optical engineers
American electrical engineers
Johns Hopkins University faculty
Year of birth missing (living people)
Living people
American women academics
21st-century American women